Balázs Szabó (born 28 October 1995) is a Hungarian football player who plays for Kazincbarcika.

Club statistics

Updated to games played as of 19 May 2019.

Honours
Diósgyőr
Hungarian League Cup (1): 2013–14

References

Balázs Szabó at HLSZ

1995 births
People from Kazincbarcika
Living people
Hungarian footballers
Association football midfielders
Diósgyőri VTK players
Soproni VSE players
BFC Siófok players
Balmazújvárosi FC players
Szolnoki MÁV FC footballers
Kazincbarcikai SC footballers
Nemzeti Bajnokság I players
Nemzeti Bajnokság II players
Nemzeti Bajnokság III players
Sportspeople from Borsod-Abaúj-Zemplén County